Este Mundo is the fifth studio album by the Gipsy Kings, released in July 1991 in US and Europe; both versions are identical. "No Volveré" was covered by Tarkan as "Vazgeçemem" ("I Can't Give Up" in Turkish) on his debut album Yine Sensiz (Without You Again in Turkish) in 1992.

Track listing

Charts

Certifications and sales

References

External links
Este Mundo at gipsykings.net

1991 albums
Elektra Records albums
Gipsy Kings albums
Albums produced by Nick Patrick (record producer)